ICAD may refer to:

ICAD (software)
iCAD Inc., a medical-device manufacturer headquartered in Nashua, New Hampshire
Inhibitor of caspase-activated DNase, also called DFFA, a protein
Inter-Agency Committee on Anti-Illegal Drugs of the Philippines
International Committee Against Disappearances, Turkey
ICAD school of learning, JEE and NEET preparing institute, based in India.
International Community for Auditory Display